California's 31st congressional district is a congressional district in Los Angeles County, in the U.S. state of California. The district is located in the San Gabriel Valley.

From January 3, 2023, following the 2020 redistricting cycle, the district is currently represented by Democrat Grace Napolitano.

Competitiveness

In statewide races

Composition

As of the 2020 redistricting, California's 31st congressional district is located in Southern California. It takes up part of eastern Los Angeles County.

Los Angeles County is split between this district, the 28th district, the 34th district, and the 38th district. The 31st and the 28th are partitioned by Rio Hondo River, Garvey Ave, Highway 19, Highway 10, Eaton Wash, Temple City Blvd, Valley Blvd, Ellis Ln, Lower Azusa Rd, Grande Ave, Santa Anita Ave, Lynrose St, Flood Control Basin, Peck Rd, Randolph St, Cogswell Rd, Clark St, Durfree Ave, Santa Anita Wash, S 10th Ave, Jeffries Ave, Mayflower/Fairgreen Ave, Alta Vista/Fairgreen Ave, El Norte Ave, S 5th Ave, Valencia Way/N 5th Ave, Hillcrest Blvd, E Hillcrest Blvd, Grand Ave, E Greystone Ave, N Bradoaks Ave, Angeles National Forest, W Fork Rd, Highway 39, Cedar Creek, Iron Fork, Glendora Mountain Rd, Morris Reservoir, W Sierra Madre Ave, N Lorraine Ave, E Foothill Blvd, E Carroll Ave, Steffen St, S Lorraine Ave, AT and SF Railway, E Route 66, N Cataract Ave, San Dimas Canyon Rd, Clayton Ct, Live Oak Canyon, Rotary Dr, Highway 30, Williams Ave, Highway 210, Garey Ave, and Summer Ave.

The 31st, 35th, and 38th are partitioned by Whittier Narrows Recreation Area, N Lexington-Gallatin Rd, N Durfree Ave, E Thienes Ave, E Rush St, N Burkett Rd, Cunningham Dr, Eaglemont Dr, Oakman Dr, Arciero Dr, Grossmont Dr, Workman Mill Rd, Bunbury Dr, Fontenoy Ave, Ankerton, Whittier Woods Circle, Union Pacific Railroad, San Gabriel Freeway, N Peck Rd, Mission Mill Rd, Rose Hills Rd, Wildwood Dr, Clark Ave, San Jose Creek, Turnbull Canyon Rd, E Gale Ave, Pomona Freeway, Colima Rd, E Walnut Dr N, Nogales St, E Walnut Dr S, Fairway Dr, E Valley Blvd, Calle Baja, La Puente Rd, S Sentous Ave, N Nogales St, Amar Rd, Walnut City Parkland, San Bernardino Freeway, Fairplex Dr, Via Verde, Puddingstone Reservoir, McKinley Ave, N Whittle Ave, Arrow Highway, Fulton Rd, and Foothill Blvd. The 31st district takes in the cities of El Monte, West Covina, Baldwin Park, Azusa, Monrovia, San Dimas, La Verne, Duarte, South El Monte, and the south side of Glendora.

Cities and CDPs with 10,000 or more people
 El Monte: 109,501
 West Covina: 109,450
 Baldwin Park: 72,176
 Glendora: 52,558
 Azusa: 50,000
 Monrovia: 37,931
 San Dimas: 34,924
 La Verne: 31,334
 Duarte: 21,727
 South El Monte: 19,567

List of members representing the district

Election results

1962

1964

1966

1968

1970

1972

1974

1976

1978

1980

1982

1984

1986

1988

1990

1992

1994

1996

1998

2000

2002

2004

2006

2008

2010

2012

2014

2016

2018

2020

2022

Historical district boundaries
Formerly, from 2003 to 2013,  the district was located in Los Angeles County. It was the only congressional district entirely based within the City of Los Angeles, and included Hollywood and some predominantly Hispanic/Latino sections of central and northeast Los Angeles.

See also
List of United States congressional districts

References

External links
GovTrack.us: California's 31st congressional district
RAND California Election Returns: District Definitions
California Voter Foundation map - CD31

31
Government of San Bernardino County, California
Inland Empire
Rancho Cucamonga, California
San Bernardino, California
Colton, California
Constituencies established in 1963
1963 establishments in California